John Morris Russell (born June 6, 1960), also known as JMR, is an American orchestral conductor best known for his association with the Cincinnati Pops Orchestra and the Buffalo Philharmonic Orchestra. He lives in Cincinnati with his wife and two children.

Biography

Early years
Born and raised in Cleveland, Ohio, Russell attended Ludlow Elementary School in Shaker Heights, outside of Cleveland. Active in theater and music in high school at Shaker Heights High School, he performed in band, orchestra, jazz ensemble as well as theatrical productions, and formed a "garage band" that played cover tunes from the great funk horn bands of the late 1970s. He began more seriously studying music while attending Williams College in Williamstown, Massachusetts, and in 1982, he graduated with a B.A. cum laude with highest honors. He continued his study with private conducting lessons at the Cleveland Institute of Music. His first work as a conductor included teaching in the public schools as well as leading the Northern Ohio Youth Orchestras in Oberlin, Ohio, and the Akron Youth Symphony.

Education
He received a Master of Music degree in conducting from the University of Southern California, Los Angeles, and a Bachelor of Arts degree in music from Williams College in Massachusetts. He has also studied at the Guildhall School of Music and Drama in London, the Cleveland Institute of Music, the Aspen Music Festival in Colorado, and the Pierre Monteux School for Conductors in Hancock, Maine.

Conducting and Performing

Cincinnati Pops Orchestra
On December 6, 2010, Russell was named conductor of the Cincinnati Pops Orchestra, effective September 1, 2011, succeeding the late Erich Kunzel. As the Cincinnati Pops Conductor, Russell programs and conducts performances annually at Music Hall and Riverbend Music Center, as well as leading performances in the community and overseeing the Orchestra's Lollipop Family Concerts. He will be staying with the Pops through the 2022–23 season.

Hilton Head Symphony Orchestra
Russell was named the music director and Principal Conductor of the Hilton Head Symphony Orchestra in March 2012. He began his Season with the Symphony on October 22, 2012. He has consistently won international praise for his extraordinary music-making and visionary leadership.

Buffalo Philharmonic Orchestra
In April 2015, Russell was named Buffalo Philharmonic Orchestra principal pops conductor.

Windsor Symphony Orchestra
In May 2011, the University of Windsor announced Russell would receive an honorary degree during its spring convocation ceremony for his contributions to the growth and invigoration in musical life in Windsor, Ontario. Maestro Russell served as music director of the Windsor Symphony Orchestra in Windsor, Ontario, Canada, between 2001 and 2012. He conducted performances of 45 world premiers, many under the auspices of the Windsor Canadian Music Festival. In May 2011, the University of Windsor awarded him an honorary degree for his contributions to the growth and invigoration in musical life in Windsor, Ontario.

Guest conductor
As a guest conductor, Maestro Russell has led many of North America's most distinguished ensembles, including the orchestras of Toronto, Edmonton, Calgary, Victoria, Kitchener-Waterloo, Detroit, Houston, Indianapolis, Dallas, Louisville, Boston Pops, The Cleveland Orchestra, Orchestra London, Miami's New World Symphony, the Minnesota Orchestra, Oregon Symphony, Colorado Symphony, New Jersey Symphony, New York Pops, New York City Ballet, New York Philharmonic and the Los Angeles Philharmonic.

Russell was associate conductor of the Cincinnati Symphony Orchestra for eleven years where he regularly led concerts at Music Hall and the Riverbend Music Center. He created the Classical Roots series, which continues to celebrate the music of African-American composers and performers in Music Hall and area churches, and was also the co-creator of the Christmas spectacular, Home for the Holidays. In September 1999, Russell replaced Erich Kunzel with an hour's notice to conduct the Cincinnati Pops' opening weekend concerts. The following week he substituted for Maestro Kunzel in concerts on the stage of the famed Musikverein in Vienna, featuring the Harlem Boychoir, the Vienna Choir Boys and actor Gregory Peck. The performance continues to be televised throughout Europe, Japan and in the USA on PBS. Maestro Russell returned to conduct the Cincinnati Pops twice in 2010. Maestro Russell has also served as associate conductor of the Savannah Symphony Orchestra, director of the orchestral program at Vanderbilt University, and music director with the College Light Opera Company in Falmouth, Massachusetts.

Reputation
Russell has consistently won international praise for music-making and leadership. As music director of the Windsor Symphony Orchestra, Russell fostered a decade of artistic growth and invigorated the musical life of the Windsor-Essex region. A former colleague described him as an enthusiastic "wind-up toy".

Awards
A two-time recipient of Ontario's Lieutenant Governor's Award for the Arts, as well as the Ontario Arts Council's Vida Peene Award for Artistic Excellence, Maestro Russell and the WSO also won coveted nominations for both the Gemini Awards (2004) and Juno Awards (2008). In 2010, Russell received the Herb Gray Harmony Award by the Multicultural Council of Windsor and Essex County, in recognition of the WSO's programming and outreach activities that support and celebrate the region's diversity, as well as Russell's strategies to encourage a harmonious society. In October 2010 he was honored as the first recipient of the Arts Leadership Award by the Windsor Endowment for the Arts, in recognition of the contribution he has made to the region's cultural life.

Radio and television
The Windsor Symphony Orchestra has made seventeen national broadcasts on CBC Radio 2 with Maestro Russell, including concerts from the Masterworks and Intimate Classics series, and the annual Windsor Canadian Music Festival. The most recent CBC broadcast recording of Aurora Borealis by Jordon Nobles, was selected to represent Canada in the 57th annual International Rostrum of Composers in Lisbon, Portugal in June 2010. The WSO's first nationally televised production was created with Mr. Russell for the CBC Television series Opening Night, which subsequently won the Gold Worldmedal for "Best Performance Program" at the New York Festivals Awards for Television and New Media, as well as a Gemini Award Nomination.

Recordings
In 2006 the Windsor Symphony Orchestra released Prokofiev's Peter and the Wolf narrated by actor Colm Feore, and Last Minute Lulu, composed by WSO Composer-in-Residence, Brent Lee, with text by the Newbery Medal winning author, Christopher Paul Curtis. The recording won Russell and the WSO its first Juno nomination for Best Children's Album in 2008.

On December 12, 2011, Russell recorded his first CD with the Cincinnati Pops Orchestra. "Home for the Holidays" also features the Cincinnati May Festival Chorus, Rodrick Dixon, Brian Stokes Mitchell, and New York Voices. Russell's second album with the Cincinnati Pops Orchestra, "Superheroes!" was recorded in October 2012 and released on September 24, 2013. "Superheroes!" showcases musical scores from Hollywood blockbusters such as The Avengers, The Dark Knight, and Iron Man, and features guest appearances by Adam West, the Cincinnati May Festival Youth Chorus, and the University of Cincinnati College-Conservatory of Music Musical Theatre Department. On November 11, 2014, "Carnival of the Animals," Russell's third album with the Cincinnati Pops Orchestra, was released. Mr. Russell's own orchestration of Camille Saint-Saëns' classic Carnival of the Animals is featured on the album, along with other animal-inspired classics like "Ballet of the Unhatched Chicks" and "Flight of the Bumblebee." September 11, 2015 marked the release of "American Originals," Russell's fourth album with the Cincinnati Pops, is the first "live" recording of the Pops (during concerts in January 2015) and features icons of the American folk and roots music scene such as Rosanne Cash, Joe Henry, over the Rhine, Dom Flemons, Aoife O'Donovan, and Cincinnati's own Comet Bluegrass All-stars. All of Maestro Russell's albums with the Cincinnati Pops Orchestra were recorded in Music Hall (Cincinnati), released on the Fanfare Cincinnati label, and distributed by Naxos Records.

Educational concerts
The "Sound Discoveries" series Russell developed with the Cincinnati Symphony Orchestra is a model for educational concerts. In Windsor, he crafted two new concert series, Peanut Butter n' Jam and Family Jamboree, specifically for youth and families, and spearheaded the creation of The Windsor-Essex Youth Choir and the Windsor Symphony Youth Orchestra. Russell's support of music in the schools has forged performance partnerships with the University of Windsor School of Music, the Windsor Centre for the Creative Arts and choral, dance and performing ensembles. With the creation of the One Community—One Symphony project in 2008, Russell has worked with over a thousand teenagers in 15 school band and choral programs, representing French, Catholic and Public School Boards, in rehearsals and performances with the WSO.

During his tenure with WSO, his educational concerts engaged more than 100,000 students and teachers in Essex, Lambton and Kent counties. Russell has helped nurture many new voices in Canadian music, conducting numerous Windsor premiers of important Canadian works and over 45 world premiers of commissioned compositions. He created the WSO's first multi-year composer-in-residence position, and is deeply involved in the production of the annual Windsor Canadian Music Festival, described by CBC producer David Jaeger as, "one of the most exciting and innovative developments to appear lately in the Canadian musical scene."

References 

Living people
American male conductors (music)
Aspen Music Festival and School alumni
USC Thornton School of Music alumni
Williams College alumni
Musicians from Shaker Heights, Ohio
1960 births
Classical musicians from Ohio
21st-century American conductors (music)
21st-century American male musicians